Qian yan wan yu may refer to:

 "Qian yan wan yu", a 1973 song sung by Teresa Teng in The Young Ones (1973 film)
 Ordinary Heroes (1999 film), 1999